Idols 2 was the second season of the Dutch version of Idols hosted by Reinout Oerlemans & Tooske Ragas. The winner was Boris Titulaer with Maud Mulder as runner-up.

Summaries

Contestants
(ages stated are at time of contest)
(in order of elimination)
Meike Hurts, 22
Robin Zijlstra, 24
Ron Link, 24
Alice Hoes, 18
Eric Bouwman, 21
Irma van Pamelen, 19
Marlies Schuitemaker, 23
JK, 23
Maud Mulder, 22 (runner-up)
Boris Titulaer, 23 (winner)

Liveshow Themes
Liveshow 1 (March 6, 2004): My Idol
Liveshow 2 (March 13, 2004): Motown
Liveshow 3 (March 20, 2004): Top 40 Hits
Liveshow 4 (March 27, 2004): Disco
Liveshow 5 (April 3, 2004): Dutch Hits
Liveshow 6 (April 10, 2004): Party
Liveshow 7 (April 17, 2004): Big Band
Liveshow 8 (April 24, 2004): People's Choice
Final Liveshow (May 1, 2004)

Judges
Henkjan Smits
Eric van Tijn
Jerney Kaagman
Edwin Jansen

Finals

Live show details

Heat 1 (31 January 2004)

Notes
The judges selected Ron Link to move on into the Top 10 of the competition, before the hosts revealed the Top 4 vote getters. Marlies Schuitemaker and Maud Mulder advanced to the top 10 of the competition. The other 6 contestants were eliminated.
Sharon Doorson and Frank de Graaf returned for a second chance at the top 10 in the Wildcard Round.

Heat 2 (7 February 2004)

Notes
The judges selected Meike Hurts to move on into the Top 10 of the competition, before the hosts revealed the Top 4 vote getters. Robin Zijlstra and JK advanced to the top 10 of the competition. The other 6 contestants were eliminated.
Nick Schilder and Merel Koman returned for a second chance at the top 10 in the Wildcard Round.

Heat 3 (14 February 2004)

Notes
The judges selected Eric Bouwman to move on into the Top 10 of the competition, before the hosts revealed the Top 4 vote getters. Boris Titulaer and Irma van Pamelen advanced to the top 10 of the competition. The other 6 contestants were eliminated.
Alice Hoes and Tialda van Slogteren returned for a second chance at the top 10 in the Wildcard Round.

Wildcard round (21 February 2004)

Notes
Alice Hoes received the most votes, and completed the top 10.

Live Show 1 (6 March 2004)
Theme: My Idol

Live Show 2 (13 March 2004)
Theme: Motown

Live Show 3 (20 March 2004)
Theme: Top 40 Hits

Live Show 4 (27 March 2004)
Theme: Disco

Live Show 5 (3 April 2004)
Theme: Dutch Hits

Live Show 6 (10 April 2004)
Theme: Party

Live Show 7 (17 April 2004)
Theme: Big Band

Live Show 8: Semi-final (24 April 2004)
Theme: People's Choice

Live final (1 May 2004)

Season 02
2003 Dutch television seasons
2004 Dutch television seasons